In computer architecture, dual processor can refer to two different types of multiprocessing:

 A computer with two central processing units
 A dual-core central processing unit: two processors combined into a single integrated circuit or package